Suhail, from , is the common name of a number of stars typically seen near the southern horizon.

It is part of the traditional names of three stars in the constellation Argo Navis.
 

 Gamma Velorum has the traditional name Al Suhail al Muhlif, also known as Regor.

 Zeta Puppis, in the constellation of Puppis, is traditionally known as Suhail Hadar.

Stars named from the Arabic language
Argo Navis
Carina (constellation)
Puppis
Vela (constellation)